Dynamic problems in computational complexity theory are problems stated in terms of the changing input data. In the most general form a problem in this category is usually stated as follows:
 Given a class of input objects, find efficient algorithms and data structures to answer a certain query about a set of input objects each time the input data is modified, i.e., objects are inserted or deleted.

Problems of this class have the following measures of complexity:
 Space the amount of memory space required to store the data structure;
 Initialization time time required for the initial construction of the data structure;
 Insertion time time required for the update of the data structure when one more input element is added;
 Deletion time time required for the update of the data structure when an input element is deleted;
 Query time time required to answer a query;
 Other operations specific to the problem in question

The overall set of computations for a dynamic problem is called a dynamic algorithm.

Many algorithmic problems stated in terms of fixed input data (called static problems in this context and solved by static algorithms) have meaningful dynamic versions.

Special cases
Incremental algorithms, or online algorithms, are algorithms in which only additions of elements are allowed, possibly starting from the empty/trivial input data.

Decremental algorithms are algorithms in which only deletions of elements are allowed, starting with an initialization of a full data structure.

If both additions and deletions are allowed, the algorithm is sometimes called fully dynamic.

Examples

Maximal element
Static problem  For a set of N numbers find the maximal one.

The problem may be solved in O(N) time.

Dynamic problem  For an initial set of N numbers, dynamically maintain the maximal one when insertion and deletions are allowed.

A well-known solution for this problem is using a self-balancing binary search tree. It takes space O(N), may be initially constructed in time O(N log N) and provides insertion, deletion and query times in O(log N).

The priority queue maintenance problem It is a simplified version of this dynamic problem, where one requires to delete only the maximal element. This version may do with simpler data structures.

Graphs
Given a graph, maintain its parameters, such as connectivity, maximal degree, shortest paths etc., when insertion and deletion of its edges are allowed.

See also
 Dynamization
 Dynamic connectivity
 Kinetic data structure

References

Computational complexity theory